The David Lane House is a historic house at 137 North Road in Bedford, Massachusetts.  The main block of this  story wood frame Cape style house was built in the 1780s by David Lane, who was a fifer in the Bedford minute company at the Battles of Lexington and Concord in 1775.  There is architectural evidence suggesting that part of the house was built by his grandfather, Job Lane, about 1720.  The house has high-quality interior woodwork dating to the time of the house's construction.

The house was listed on the National Register of Historic Places in 1980.

See also
National Register of Historic Places listings in Middlesex County, Massachusetts

References

Houses on the National Register of Historic Places in Middlesex County, Massachusetts
Houses in Bedford, Massachusetts